The 2016–17 Toledo Rockets women's basketball team represented University of Toledo during the 2016–17 NCAA Division I women's basketball season. The Rockets, led by ninth year head coach Tricia Cullop, played their home games at Savage Arena, as members of the West Division of the Mid-American Conference. They finished the season 25–9, 12–6 in MAC play to finish in a tie for third place in the West Division. They defeated Kent State, Buffalo and Northern Illinois to win the MAC Tournament to earn an automatic bid to the NCAA women's tournament for the first time since 2001. They lost to Creighton in the first round.

Roster

Schedule
Source: 

|-
!colspan=9 style="background:#000080; color:#F9D819;"| Exhibition

|-
!colspan=9 style="background:#000080; color:#F9D819;"| Non-conference regular season

|-
!colspan=9 style="background:#000080; color:#F9D819;"| MAC regular season

|-
!colspan=9 style="background:#000080; color:#F9D819;"| MAC Women's Tournament

|-
!colspan=9 style="background:#000080; color:#F9D819;"| NCAA Women's Tournament

See also
 2016–17 Toledo Rockets men's basketball team

References

Toledo
Toledo Rockets women's basketball seasons
Toledo